George Walton Berry (February 18, 1900 – February 25, 1986) was a guard in the National Football League. He split his first season between the Racine Legion and the Hammond Pros. He played another season with the Hammond Pros before splitting the 1924 NFL season with Hammond and the Akron Pros. Berry played another year in Akron, during which time the team changed their name to the Indians, before splitting his final season with Akron and the Hammond Pros.

References

Players of American football from Milwaukee
Racine Legion players
Hammond Pros players
Akron Pros players
Akron Indians players
American football offensive guards
1900 births
1986 deaths